Ishtapraaneshwari is a 1979 Indian Malayalam language film,  directed by Sajan. The film stars Jose, Shobha. The film has musical score by Shyam.

Cast
 Jose as Rajan
 Shobha as Rema
 Kanchana	 as Rajani
Kaduvakulam Antony as Kurup
P. K. Abraham as Muthalali 
Thodupuzha Radhakrishnan as Bhadran
Thrissur Gracy as Syamala
Syamala as Leela
Ramesh as Velayudhan

Soundtrack
The music was composed by Shyam and the lyrics were written by Bichu Thirumala.

References

External links
 

1979 films
1970s Malayalam-language films